The Discoverers is an educational video game developed by Knowledge Adventure and released in 1994 for DOS.

References 

Educational video games
1994 video games
DOS games
DOS-only games
Video games developed in the United States